Rocktram (also, Rockfram) is an unincorporated community in Napa County, California. It lies at an elevation of 13 feet (4 m). This area got its name from an overhead tramway between the Basalt Rock Company quarry and a plant located on the Napa River. The tram crossed California State Route 221 near what is now Kaiser Road. Metal containers that hung from a steel cable transported rock from Basalt's quarry on the hills east of the highway to the plant on the river. The rocks were loaded on barges and floated to construction sites from Sacramento to San Francisco. Rocks from Basalt were used in the construction of Treasure Island and most of the Bay Area bridges.

References

Unincorporated communities in California
Unincorporated communities in Napa County, California